Maggot farming is the act of growing maggots for industry. It is distinct from vermicomposting, as there is no separate composting process occurring and maggots are used to consume flesh, rather than earthworms to consume plant-based materials.

Species used
A variety of species can be used, including the black soldier fly. Due to convenience, fly species are often used which are indigenous to the area of cultivation.

Method of cultivation
When using indigenous fly species, one tactic (employed by the Songhai Center in Benin) is to simply dump offal or meat that has exceeded the sell-by date in concrete bins. The bins are then covered with chicken wire to prevent any large animals from feeding. Then, flies deposit eggs on the offal and meat, and maggots hatch and consume it. After that, the bins are filled with water, so the maggots start to float (separating themselves from any leftovers). The maggots are then harvested and the leftover is discarded or further processed (e.g., bones can be ground to bone meal). An alternative method can be seen used more commonly in small scale applications, such as two trash bins stacked on top of each other. The bottom bin having a large hole cut on top, while the top having smaller, filtered holes on the bottom. Food (waste) is then inserted and left into the top bin, where the flies will lay their eggs and produce maggots, shifting and separating into the bottom bin.

Use of the maggots
The maggots are often sold and used as animal feed: in particular, for fish, chickens, pigs, and ducks. AgriProtein, a British company specializing in insect protein production, is pushing for more international business, claiming to hold the potential to shift the fish feed market away from energy expensive fish farming. They can also be sold as fishing bait. It is also possible to extract insect fat, protein (for human consumption), and chitin. AgriProtein claims to produce over three thousand tons of fatty-acid oil as a byproduct and sixteen tons of frass, or fly droppings per plant, which can be used as a valuable fertilizer.

See also
 AgriProtein
 Protix
 Shelf life
 Biorefinery

References

External links
 Case 101
 Case 2
 Songhai Center Benin

Insect farming
Waste
Food and the environment
Biodegradable waste management